Hark at Barker is a 1969  British comedy series combining elements of sitcom and sketch show, which starred Ronnie Barker. It was made for the ITV network by London Weekend Television.

Each show began with a spoof news item read by Barker as the announcer. He would then introduce the main part of the programme, a lecture to be given by Lord Rustless (also Barker) on a different topic each week from his stately home, Chrome Hall. Helped and hindered by Rustless' secretary (Mildred) Bates, his Butler Badger, his bad-tempered Cook, his incoherent gardener Dithers and (in Series 2) his buxom, near-mute maid Effie, these lectures invariably degenerated into farce, and were frequently interrupted by comic sketches on location or in the studio which also starred Barker in differing roles.

Barker reprised the role of Lord Rustless in the BBC series His Lordship Entertains, and played very similar characters in Futtock's End and the Two Ronnies specials The Picnic and By the Sea.

Writers
The Chrome Hall sequences were written by Peter Cauldfield (a pseudonym of Alan Ayckbourn). Writers on the sketches included Gerald Wiley (Barker), Eric Idle, and the team of Graeme Garden and Bill Oddie (some of their sketches reprised material from I'm Sorry I'll Read That Again, and another was a forerunner of The Goodies episode "Bunfight at the OK Tea Room").

Regular cast
 Ronnie Barker - Announcer / Lord Rustless / Various sketch characters
 David Jason - Dithers / Various sketch characters
 Frank Gatliff - Badger
 Josephine Tewson - Mildred Bates
 Mary Baxter - Cook
 Moira Foot - Effie the maid (series 2 only)
 Other sketch performers included Pauline Yates, Michael Palin, Jo Kendall and Ronnie Corbett.

Episode guide
Series 1 (11 April 1969 – 30 May 1969) - Produced in black and white

1. "Meet Lord Rustless" 11 April 1969
2. "Rustless And Women" 18 April 1969
3. "Rustless In Pigtails" 25 April 1969
4. "Rustless And A Banquet" 2 May 1969
5. "Rustless And Murder" 9 May 1969
6. "Rustless And Foreigners" 16 May 1969
7. "Rustless And The Solar System" 23 May 1969
8. "Rustless And Relics" 30 May 1969

Series 2 (10 July 1970 – 21 August 1970) - Produced in colour

1. "Rustless On Music" 10 July 1970
2. "Rustless On Law" 17 July 1970
3. "Rustless On Communications" 24 July 1970
4. "Rustless On Cooking" 31 July 1970
5. "Rustless On Medicine" 7 August 1970
6. "Rustless On Do-It-Yourself" 14 August 1970
7. "Rustless On Sport" 21 August 1970

All Star Comedy Carnival Christmas Special (25 December 1970) - Produced in black and white due to the ITV Colour Strike

Archive status and DVD release
All episodes exist on their original 2 inch Quad b&w and PAL colour videotapes bar "Rustless on Law" from series 2, which only exists as a 16 mm b/w telerecording. The series was released on Region 2 DVD in 2008 by Network DVD, and are also included in The Ronnie Barker Collection along with Six Dates With Barker .

External links

Comedy Guide - Hark At Barker at bbc.co.uk
Hark at Barker episode guide
Lost Shows on Hark at Barker
Paul Lewis, 2008: Review of the Network DVD release of Hark at Barker. DVDCompare

ITV sitcoms
1969 British television series debuts
1970 British television series endings
1960s British television sketch shows
1970s British comedy television series
Television series by ITV Studios
London Weekend Television shows
English-language television shows